The DA* 16–50mm lens is a family of professional wide-angle lenses made by Ricoh Imaging. The current version, the HD DA* 16-50mm f/2.8L ED PLM AW, replaced the older smc DA* 16-50mm f/2.8 ED IF SDM lens in 2021.

smc DA* 16-50mm F2.8 ED AL (IF) SDM
The Pentax smc DA* 16-50mm F2.8 ED AL (IF) SDM is an advanced standard zoom lens for Pentax K-mount APS-C DSLR bodies, announced by Pentax on February 21, 2007.

HD DA* 16-50mm F2.8 ED PLM AW
The Pentax smc DA* 16-50mm F2.8 ED AL (IF) SDM is an professional standard zoom lens for Pentax K-mount APS-C DSLR bodies. Development was announced on 25th May 2020, officially product name announced on October 25th 2021, launched on July 15th 2021 and first shipped in August 2021.

Specifications

References

External links
Specifications, KMP
Specifications, Imaging Ressource
Review / Test Report, OpticalLimits!
HD PENTAX-DA★ 16-50mm F2.8ED PLM AW: A large-aperture standard zoom lens for APS-C, Ricoh Imaging Blog
Product Page, Ricoh Imaging Europe
Special Content Site, Ricoh Imaging Global

16-50
Camera lenses introduced in 2007